The Vanguard 15 is an American sailing dinghy that was designed by Bob Ames as a one-design racer and first built in 1992.

Production
The design was built by Team Vanguard in the United States and later by LaserPerformance, but is no longer in production.

Design
The Vanguard 15 is a recreational sailboat, built predominantly of fiberglass. It has a fractional sloop rig with aluminum spars, a raked stem, a vertical transom, a transom-hung rudder controlled by a tiller and a retractable daggerboard. It displaces  and is capable of planing upwind.

For sailing the design is equipped with a boom vang and the mainsail and jib have windows for improved visibility. The halyards are external and the mast is of a non-tapered design. The boat is normally raced with a crew of two sailors.

Operational history
In a 1994 review Richard Sherwood wrote, "the Vanguard 15 is designed for college/yacht club racing fleets. Rig is simple, and the boat is a strict one-design. The deck is rounded, for easy hiking ... With the daggerboard and light weight, the boat may be easily dry sailed — often helpful for fleet sailing."

In 2014, a Vanguard 15 one-design racer, John Storck III, reported that the boat was falling out of favor with college sailors and that attendance at regattas was declining.

See also
List of sailing boat types

References

External links

Dinghies
1990s sailboat type designs
Sailboat type designs by Bob Ames
Sailboat types built by Team Vanguard
Sailboat types built by LaserPerformance